Megachile riojana is a species of bee in the family Megachilidae. It was described by Schrottky in 1920.

References

Riojana
Insects described in 1920